Lieutenant-Colonel Thomas Aird (21 December 17601 November 1839) was a British Army officer of the Napoleonic era who was present at the Battle of Waterloo on 18June 1815.

Career
Born in Maybole, South Ayrshire, Scotland, Aird joined the 2nd Dragoons as a cornet on 20August 1784.

He served during the Peninsular War and in Flanders and commanded the Royal Waggon Train at the Battle of Waterloo.

On 25December 1818 he was placed on half pay and died on 1November 1839 in Sunderland, North East England. There is a memorial tablet dedicated to Aird in the Parish Church at Maybole.

Personal life
Aird had a daughter who in 1814 married Lieutenant John Raleigh Elwes of the 71st (Highland) Regiment of Foot who died of wounds received at Waterloo a few days after the battle.

References

Bibliography

1760 births
1839 deaths
British Army personnel of the Napoleonic Wars
Royal Waggon Train officers